Terms such as Microsoft phone and Microsoft phones may refer to:
Windows Phone, a defunct family of mobile operating systems from Microsoft, successor to Windows Mobile
My Windows Phone, a user help service on said systems
Windows Mobile, a defunct family of mobile operating systems from Microsoft
Microsoft Mobile, a defunct Microsoft subsidiary that created actual mobile phones

See also 
 Microsoft
 History of Microsoft
 Microsoft mobile services
 Overview of Microsoft hardware